The Lotena Formation is a geologic formation dated from the Late Callovian to Early Oxfordian in the Neuquén Basin in Mendoza Province, Argentina. The formation, first defined by Weaver in 1931 and named after Cerro Lotena, consists of fluvial conglomerates, calcareous sandstones and marine limestones and shales. The Lotena Formation is overlain by the La Manga Formation and overlies the Lajas Formation of the Cuyo Group. Initially, the fossil find of the pterosaur Herbstosaurus pigmaeus was reported from the formation, but this fossil was found in the younger Vaca Muerta. The formation is a reservoir rock in the Neuquén Basin.

See also 
 Los Molles Formation, contemporaneous formation of the Neuquén Basin
 Cañadón Calcáreo Formation, contemporaneous formation of the Cañadón Asfalto Basin

References

Bibliography 
 
 
 

Geologic formations of Argentina
Late Jurassic South America
Middle Jurassic South America
Jurassic System of South America
Jurassic Argentina
Callovian Stage
Oxfordian Stage
Conglomerate formations
Sandstone formations
Shale formations
Limestone formations
Fluvial deposits
Reservoir rock formations
Formations
Geology of Mendoza Province
Geology of Neuquén Province
Geology of Patagonia